is a former Japanese football player.

Club statistics

References

External links

1987 births
Living people
Juntendo University alumni
Association football people from Osaka Prefecture
Japanese footballers
J1 League players
J2 League players
Japan Football League players
Yokohama F. Marinos players
Gainare Tottori players
FC Ryukyu players
Renofa Yamaguchi FC players
Association football midfielders